Australia at the 1994 Commonwealth Games was abbreviated AUS. This was their fifteenth of 15 Commonwealth Games having participated in all Games meets up to these Games.

Medallists
'The following Australian competitors won medals at the games.

| style="text-align:left; width:78%; vertical-align:top;"|

| width="22%" align="left" valign="top" |

Officials

See also 
 Australia at the 1992 Summer Olympics
 Australia at the 1996 Summer Olympics

References

External links
Commonwealth Games Australia Results Database

1994
Commonwealth Games
Nations at the 1994 Commonwealth Games